Rehma Watongola (died 14 November 2020) was a Ugandan politician.

Biography
She was a Member of the Parliament of Uganda from 2016 to 2020. Watongola died from COVID-19 aged 61.

References

1950s births
2020 deaths
Members of the Parliament of Uganda
Deaths from the COVID-19 pandemic in Uganda